Leandro Martín Baccaro Coll (born April 17, 1973) is a former field hockey player from Argentina. He competed for his native country at the 1996 Summer Olympics, where he finished in ninth place with the national squad.

References

External links
 

1973 births
Living people
Argentine male field hockey players
Argentine people of Italian descent
Field hockey players at the 1996 Summer Olympics
Olympic field hockey players of Argentina